Fenesk (also known as Fīnesk and Qenīsk) is a village in Poshtkuh Rural District, Shahmirzad District, Mehdishahr County, Semnan Province, Iran. At the 2006 census, its population was 25, in 7 families.

References 

Populated places in Mehdishahr County